Thomas Patrick Dowdall (1872 – 7 April 1942) was an Irish Fianna Fáil politician and company director.

Early life
He was born at Chatham Barracks, Gillingham, Kent, the son of Charles Dowdall, colour sergeant in the 48th foot, and Margaret Dowdall (née Cassidy) of Bandon, County Cork. He and his brother James were educated at the Presentation College, Grand Parade, Cork; together they then visited Denmark, where they studied butter manufacture. Returning to Cork, fluent in Danish and Swedish, the two joined Dowdall Bros, the creamery business of their uncle J. B. Dowdall, which had extensive business contacts in the Baltic countries. Between 1886 and 1888, J. B. Dowdall was instrumental in building or enlarging thirteen creameries and amalgamating them into a consortium known as Anglo-Irish Creameries.

Business career
After a short time Thomas took charge of the substantial Irish business, and on the death of their uncle the two Dowdall brothers and their cousin J. B. O'Mahoney formed Dowdall, O'Mahoney & Co. (1905). They soon built up an extensive butter business in Cork, with branches in Manchester, London, and Cardiff; the company also manufactured margarine and soap. A founder member of the Cork Industrial Development Association, Thomas Dowdall was a trustee of the Cork chamber of commerce and vice-president (1939–1940) of the Cork incorporated chamber of commerce and shipping. He was the first chairman (1938) of the company that owned The Standard, he played a key role in the revival of this catholic newspaper. He was a benevolent and enlightened employer and citizen; his generosity was considerable and largely conferred anonymously.

Political career
Dowdall was a keen supporter of the Irish Volunteers and later of Sinn Féin; he endorsed the 1921 Anglo-Irish Treaty and used his influence with others to have it ratified. During the Irish Civil War he acted as an intermediary between the warring factions in Cork and became chairman of the Cork Progressive Association. He was honorary treasurer of the Cork city executive of Cumann na nGaedheal, before joining Fianna Fáil with his brother in 1927. In Fianna Fáil he was instrumental in persuading TDs to take their seats in the Dáil and was a founding director of The Irish Press.

He was first elected to Dáil Éireann as a Fianna Fáil Teachta Dála (TD) for the Cork Borough constituency at the 1932 general election. He was re-elected at the 1933, 1937 and 1938 general elections. Dowdall rarely spoke in the Dáil, but he was a strong advocate of re-afforestation, and outside the chamber he was a co-founder of the Forestry Society and contributed towards the publication of John Mackay's The rape of Ireland (1940). He was also in favour of protectionism and the establishment of a merchant navy.

His brother James Charles Dowdall, was a Fianna Fáil senator from 1922 to 1936. Unmarried, Thomas Dowdall lived at 4 Alexandra Terrace, St Luke's, Cork. He died 7 April 1942 in Cork, during the 10th Dáil, no by-election was held for his seat.

References

1872 births
1942 deaths
Fianna Fáil TDs
Members of the 7th Dáil
Members of the 8th Dáil
Members of the 9th Dáil
Members of the 10th Dáil
Politicians from County Cork